Two-time defending champion Serena Williams defeated Simona Halep in the final, 6–3, 6–0 to win the singles tennis title at the 2014 WTA Finals. Williams became the third player to win three consecutive Tour Finals singles titles (after Martina Navratilova and Monica Seles), and the first since Seles in 1992. During the tournament, she clinched her second consecutive and fourth career year-end world No. 1 ranking. She became the first woman to hold the top ranking for the entire calendar year since Steffi Graf in 1996. This was also Williams' final appearance in the Tour Finals.

Halep and Eugenie Bouchard made their debuts at the event.

For the first time since 2004 and just the second time ever, a player with a 2–1 round robin record failed to reach the semifinals. This was Ana Ivanovic, who would have reached the semifinal had she defeated Halep in straight sets in her last round-robin match.

Players

Alternates

Draw

Finals

Red group

White group

References
Main Draw

2014 Singles
Finals